You Must Be Certain of the Devil is the fifth album by American avant-garde performer Diamanda Galás, released on May 23, 1988 by record label Mute.

Content 

You Must Be Certain of the Devil is the final instalment in her "Masque of the Red Death" trilogy about the AIDS epidemic. The selections from this instalment are rooted in American gospel music.

Track listing

Personnel

Diamanda Galás – vocals, organ, piano, synthesizer, keyboards, production
John Dent – mastering
F. M. Einheit – drums (B2), chains (A2)
Naut Humon – samples
Gareth Jones – production
Kurt Schmidt – guitar (A2 & 4)
Pete Schmidt – engineering
Charlie Terstappen – drums
Peter Zimmermann – percussion

Charts

References

External links 

 

Diamanda Galás albums
1988 albums
Albums produced by Gareth Jones (music producer)
Mute Records albums